The men's 5000 metres event at the 1971 Pan American Games was held in Cali on 2 August.

Results

References

Athletics at the 1971 Pan American Games
1971